

Tota  was a Bishop of Selsey when Sussex was being ruled by Offa of Mercia.

Not very much is known of Tota but he is recorded as present at a church council (Synod of Calcuthiens) attended by papal legates in 786. He was consecrated between 781 and 786.

Tota died between 786 and 789.

Notes

Citations

References

External links
 

Bishops of Selsey
8th-century English bishops